The San, or Bushmen, are indigenous people in Southern Africa particularly in what is now South Africa and Botswana. Their ancient rock paintings and carvings (collectively called rock art) are found in caves and on rock shelters. The artwork depicts non-human beings, hunters, and half-human half-animal hybrids.  The half-human hybrids are believed to be medicine men or healers involved in a healing dance. A painting discovered at Blombos Cave is thought to be the oldest known instance of human art, dating to around 73,000 years ago. 
Gall writes, “The Laurens van der Post panel at Tsodilo is one of the most famous rock paintings.”  High on this rock face in Botswana is the image of a “magnificent red eland bull” painted, according to Van der Post, “only as a Bushman who had a deep identification with the eland could have painted him.”  Also on this rock face is a female giraffe that is motionless, as if alarmed by a predator.  Several other images of animals are depicted there too, along with the flesh blood-red handprints that are the signature of the unknown artist. The Drakensberg and Lesotho is particularly well known for its San rock art.
Tsodilo was recognised as a UNESCO World Heritage Site in 2001; not all the art covered by this is by San people or their ancestors.

Learning from rock art 
According to Thomas Dowson, “a lot of rock art is actually in symbols and metaphors.”  For example, eland bulls, meant marriage, and curing or the trance dance. Rock art gives us a glimpse of the San's history, and how they lived their lives.

San also used rock art to record things that happened in their lives.  Several instances of rock art have been found that resemble wagons and colonists.  Dowson notes that, “The people who brought in the wagons and so forth thus became, whether they realized it or not, part of the social production of southern African rock art. They added a new dimension. Dorothea Bleek, writer of the article “Beliefs and Customs of the /Xam Bushmen”, published 1933, says the San also recorded “rain dance animals”.  When they did rain dances they would go into a trance to “capture” one of these animals.  In their trance they would kill it, and its blood and milk became the rain. As depicted in the rock art, the rain dance animals they “saw” usually resembled a hippopotamus or antelope, and were sometimes surrounded by fish according to Dowson.

We can also learn more about how the San lived through their rock art.  In the following depiction, the people are all in a dancing stance, and the women are all clapping.  So, according to Dowson, it is believed to be one of their healing or trance dances.  Everyone is the same; one is not more elaborate or more detailed than another.  This shows that though the healers held special powers, they were not thought of as higher or better.  Healing was not for becoming a more prominent and powerful person, it was for the good of the entire community.

H. C. Woodhouse, author of the book Archaeology in Southern Africa, says historical sources have also said that the San often disguised themselves as animals so they could get close enough to grazing herds to shoot them.  The head of the buck was an important part of this disguise, and was also used in dancing and miming of the actions of animals.  The large number of buckheaded figures in paintings is proof that the San did this.

Later San rock art began to illustrate contact with European settlers. A famous example is of a sailing ship, known as the Porterville Galleon (found 150 kilometres inland in the Skurweberg Mountains near the town of Porterville). The picture is thought to represent a Dutch ship and have been created in the mid-17th Century. Later examples of colonial subject matter include women wearing European-style dresses, men with guns, and wagons and carts made during the 19th Century.

Production of rock art
Woodhouse also says the San used different coloured stone to do the drawings.  He says, “They usually used red rock, which they ground until it was fine, and then mixed it with fat.”  They then rubbed this on the rock to form the pictures.  This paint that they used withstands the rain and weather for very long periods of time. The San then, according to Phillip V. Tobias, an Honorary Professor of Palaeoanthropology at the Bernard Price Institute for Palaeontological Research, used this paint in four different styles.  These four style techniques are “monochromes, animal outlines in thick red lines, thinly outlined figures, and white stylized figures.” A.R. Willcox, writer of the article “Australian and South African Rock-Art Compared”, published 1959, says the tool they used to do these paintings was “a brush made from animal’s hair or a single small feather.”  This may be one reason for the great fineness and delicacy of their painting. I. and J. Rudner, writers of the journal “Who Were the Artists? Archaeological Notes from South West Africa”, published 1959, say the form that the San use is often referred to as a Dynamic School.  “It has a lot of action and color, and reached its climax in the shaded eland pictures.”  It is usually associated with the San. 

According to Woodhouse, clues are given as to who worked on the rock art by the subjects that are chosen.  There are many pictures of the Eland, Reybuck, Hartebeest and Lion, and also of San and  fighting. However, there are few depictions of plants.  Wilcox notes that, “plants usually fell in the domain of women, so it is presumed that the authors of these paintings were men.”

Digitization and conservation 
The South African Rock Art Digital Archive(SARADA) contains over 250,000 images, tracings, and historical documents of ancient African rock art. In addition to making images of the art accessible to a much wider swath of the public, the project help protects art from the physical damage that comes from regular in-person visits.

See also
 San healing practices
 San religion

Paintings
 Driekops Eiland
 The White Lady

Painting sites
 Apollo 11 Cave
 Drakensberg
 Tsodilo Hills, World Heritage site in Botswana
 Twyfelfontein, World Heritage site in Namibia
 Wildebeest Kuil Rock Art Centre

External links

 The Digital Bleek and Lloyd
 The South African Rock Art Digital Archive

Further reading

Notes

Botswana culture
Namibian culture
Rock art in Africa
San people